Senator Lindsley may refer to:

Adrian Van Sinderen Lindsley (1814–1885), Tennessee State Senate
M. P. Lindsley (1825–1883), Wisconsin State Senate

See also
Senator Lindsey (disambiguation)